Cyprus participated in the Junior Eurovision Song Contest 2003 which took place in Copenhagen, Denmark. Theodora Rafti represented the country with the song "Mia efhi".

Before Junior Eurovision

Internal selection 
CyBC opened the submission period for artists and composers to submit their entries until 12 September 2003. From all 29 songs submitted to CyBC, Theodora Rafti was selected as the Cypriot entrant for the 2003 contest. Her entry "Mia efhi" was presented during the television program Ora Kyprou (Cypriot time) on 15 September 2003.

At Junior Eurovision

Voting

References 

Junior Eurovision Song Contest
2003
Junior Eurovision Song Contest